Eddy is an unincorporated community in Lake County, in the U.S. state of Illinois.

History
The community was named for Charles G. Eddy, a railroad official.

References

Unincorporated communities in Lake County, Illinois
Unincorporated communities in Illinois